Liverpool Edge Hill was a borough constituency within the city and metropolitan borough of Liverpool, in the English county of Merseyside, centred on Edge Hill. It returned one Member of Parliament (MP) to the House of Commons of the Parliament of the United Kingdom, elected by the first-past-the-post voting system.

The constituency was created in 1918 and abolished in 1983.

History 
There were two by-elections in Liverpool Edge Hill, following the deaths of its incumbent Members of Parliament. At the 1947 by-election, Labour held the seat with a reduced majority, but the 1979 by-election saw a large swing against Labour who lost the seat to the Liberal David Alton — a defeat which foreshadowed Labour's national loss in the 1979 general election.

When the constituency disappeared for the 1983 general election, 59.85% of its territory was transferred to the new constituency of Liverpool Mossley Hill, where David Alton was re-elected. The remaining 40.15% of the seat fell into Liverpool Broadgreen, which was won by the Labour left-winger Terry Fields.

Michael Howard, later leader of the Conservative Party, was twice a candidate in the constituency, in the general elections of 1966 and 1970.

Boundaries 
1918–1950: The County Borough of Liverpool wards of Edge Hill and Low Hill, and part of Kensington ward.

1950–1955: The County Borough of Liverpool wards of Edge Hill, Fairfield, Kensington, and Low Hill.

1955–1974: The County Borough of Liverpool wards of Fairfield, Kensington, Picton, and Smithdown.

1974–1983: The County Borough of Liverpool wards of Fairfield, Kensington, Low Hill, Picton, and Smithdown.

Members of Parliament

Election results

Election in the 1910s

Elections in the 1920s

Elections in the 1930s

Elections in the 1940s

Elections in the 1950s

Elections in the 1960s

Elections in the 1970s

See also 
 1947 Liverpool Edge Hill by-election
 1979 Liverpool Edge Hill by-election

References 

Parliamentary constituencies in North West England (historic)
Edge Hill constituency
Constituencies of the Parliament of the United Kingdom established in 1918
Constituencies of the Parliament of the United Kingdom disestablished in 1983
Politics of Liverpool